Srinivas Rao Preston Kulkarni (born October 8, 1978) is an American diplomat and politician who was the Democratic nominee for  in both 2020 and in 2018. In 2018, he lost to incumbent Congressman Pete Olson.  In 2020, Kulkarni was defeated by Fort Bend County sheriff Troy Nehls in his second attempt to win election to the 22nd district by seven percent, 52% to 45%.

Early life and education
Born in Ruston, Louisiana in the Maharashtrian Brahmin family. Kulkarni moved to Houston with his family in 1980. His father, Venkatesh Kulkarni, an immigrant from India, was a novelist and a professor at Rice University. His mother, Margaret Preston, is a native of West Virginia and a descendant of Sam Houston. He attended Lamar High School. 

At age 18, Kulkarni was arrested for possessing less than a gram of cocaine; a felony charge was dismissed after two years of probation. Kulkarni earned a Bachelor of Arts from the University of Texas and a Master of Public Administration from the John F. Kennedy School of Government at Harvard University.

Diplomatic career
Kulkarni served in the United States Foreign Service for fourteen years, including in Iraq, Russia, Israel, Taiwan and Jamaica. He also served as a foreign policy and defense adviser to United States Senator Kirsten Gillibrand on the Senate Armed Services Committee.

Political career
Kulkarni credits Ramesh Bhutada for starting his political career off the ground. Bhutada is the national vice president of the U.S. wing of the Indian Hindu nationalist paramilitary group Rashtriya Swayamsevak Sangh, or RSS. In 2018, after winning the Democratic nomination in the 2018 primary runoff, Kulkarni gave a victory speech stating Bhutada “has been like a father to me on this campaign.” According to Federal Election Commission filings, Bhutada family have donated a total of $29,000 to Kulkarni’s 2018 and 2020 campaigns.

2018 House campaign

Kulkarni is a member of the Democratic Party. Kulkarni placed first in the March 6 Democratic primary with 31.8% of the vote, and won the subsequent May 22 runoff with 61.12% of the votes cast. Because  is one of the most diverse in Texas, his campaign took the unorthodox approach of reaching out to infrequent voters in their own neighborhoods and languages, including Gujarati, Marathi, Tamil and Mandarin. If elected, Kulkarni would have become the first Asian-American ever to serve in the Texas congressional delegation. Despite out-fundraising incumbent Pete Olson, Kulkarni lost the November 6 general election with 46.5% of the vote, in the district's closest race since Olson was first elected.

2020 House campaign

On April 3, 2019, Kulkarni announced that he would again run for Congress in the 22nd district of Texas. The Republican incumbent for that office, Pete Olson, announced he would not be running for reelection. On March 3, 2020, Kulkarni won the Democratic nomination for the seat.  

During the campaign, he came under fire for attending an event featuring Indian Prime Minister Narendra Modi, as well as accepting donations from individuals connected to the right-wing/Hindu nationalist RSS.

Kulkarni lost to the Republican nominee Troy Nehls in the 2020 general election in November.

Personal life
Kulkarni speaks English, Spanish, Marathi, Hindi, Mandarin Chinese, Russian, and Hebrew. Kulkarni has three younger siblings.

References

External links

 Sri Preston Kulkarni for Congress campaign website
 

1978 births
21st-century American politicians
21st-century American diplomats
American politicians of Indian descent
Candidates in the 2018 United States elections
Candidates in the 2020 United States elections
Harvard Kennedy School alumni
Living people
University of Texas at Austin alumni
Texas Democrats
United States congressional aides